The Toddington Narrow Gauge Railway (TNGR) is a  narrow-gauge railway running alongside the Gloucestershire and Warwickshire Railway at . It was built in 1985 when the Dowty Railway Preservation Society needed a new home for its collection of narrow-gauge rolling stock. The rail used on the railway was purchased from the Southend Pier Railway.

The railway was originally named the North Gloucestershire Railway, but in 2018 is officially called the Toddington Narrow Gauge Railway.

Locomotives

See also
 British narrow-gauge railways

References 

 
 Facebook

External links

Toddington Narrow Gauge Railway

Heritage railways in Gloucestershire
2 ft gauge railways in England